The 2013 Kerry Senior Hurling Championship was the 112th completed staging of the Kerry Senior Hurling Championship since its establishment in 1889. The championship began on 19 July 2013 and ended on 27 October 2013.

Ballyduff were the defending champions, however, they were defeated in the quarter-final stage. St. Brendan's won the title, following a 0-13 to 0-8 defeat of Lixnaw in a replay of the final.

Results

Round 1

Round 2A

Round 2B

Quarter-finals

Semi-finals

Final

Championship statistics

Miscellaneous

 The county final goes to a replay for the first time since 2007.
 St. Brendan's win the county championship for the first time since 1990. It is their eighth championship overall, taking them to fourth position on the all-time roll of honour.
 Lixnaw lose a second successive championship decider. They have now lost three county finals since their last victory in 2007.
 Crotta O'Neill's withdraw from the championship.

References

Kerry Senior Hurling Championship
Kerry Senior Hurling Championship